Richard Hershel Bloom (born June 22, 1953) is an American attorney, politician, and jurist who currently serves as a state judge in the Superior Court of Los Angeles and formerly served as a member of the California State Assembly from the 50th district, which encompasses West Los Angeles, Beverly Hills, Agoura Hills, Malibu, Topanga, Pacific Palisades, Bel Air, Brentwood, Santa Monica, Beverly Hills, West Hollywood, Hancock Park, and Hollywood, from 2012 to 2022.

Bloom was a member of the California Legislative Jewish Caucus. Prior to being elected to the Assembly in 2012, he served as mayor of Santa Monica and previously on the Santa Monica City Council for 13 years. On January 31, 2022, Bloom was appointed a state judge by Governor Gavin Newsom.

Early life and education
Bloom was born to a Jewish family and raised in Altadena and West Los Angeles. He earned a Bachelor of Arts degree in communication from the University of California, Berkeley and a Juris Doctor from the Loyola Law School.

Career

Santa Monica City Council
First elected in 1999, Bloom served on the Santa Monica City Council for 13 years, serving as mayor three times and mayor pro tempore twice. Bloom also served as Chair of the Santa Monica Bay Restoration Commission.

California Assembly
Bloom defeated incumbent Assemblymember Betsy Butler in 2012.

Bloom serves on the following Assembly committees: Transportation, Budget, Arts & Entertainment, Environmental Safety and Toxic Materials, and Higher Education. He also serves on Assembly Budget Subcommittee No. 6 on Budget Process, Oversight and Program Evaluation and is the Chairman of the Assembly Budget Subcommittee No. 3 on Resources and Transportation.

In 2013, Bloom authored the Bobcat Protection Act, which has since been signed into law, but did not result in protection of the Bobcat due to loopholes. Public pressure played a key role to influence the California Governor to direct his California Fish and Game Commission to ban trapping of Bobcat in California, even though killing the Bobcat in California National Parks and Califorania State Parks has been illegal since 1918.

On March 7, 2014, Bloom introduced legislation to ban live performances and captive breeding of orcas. The legislation, if passed into law, would affect SeaWorld San Diego's "Shamu" performances.

On November 4, 2014, Bloom was re-elected to a second term with nearly 72% of the vote.

In the 2015 legislative session, Bloom introduced legislation to ban plastic microbeads in personal care products. The bill has been signed into law by Governor Jerry Brown.

In the 2016 legislative session, Bloom re-introduced legislation to ban captive orca shows. The bill passed both chambers of the legislature.

Bloom did not run in the 2022 election. On December 5, 2022, Rick Chavez Zbur was sworn in as Bloom's successor.

Electoral history

2014 California State Assembly

2016 California State Assembly

2018 California State Assembly

2020 California State Assembly

References

External links 
 
 Join Richard Bloom

Living people
1953 births
Jewish American state legislators in California
Democratic Party members of the California State Assembly
21st-century American politicians
People from Santa Monica, California
21st-century American Jews